The 2008 Asian Men's Youth Handball Championship (3rd tournament) took place in Amman from 11 July–21 July. It acts as the Asian qualifying tournament for the 2009 Men's Youth World Handball Championship in Tunisia.

Draw

Preliminary round

Group A

Group B

Placement 5th–10th

9th/10th

7th/8th

5th/6th

Final round

Semifinals

Bronze medal match

Gold medal match

Final standing

References
www.asianhandball.com

International handball competitions hosted by Jordan
Asian Mens Youth Handball Championship, 2008
Asia
Asian Handball Championships
Sports competitions in Amman